Harr Nishaan (हरि/ਹਰਿ) or Nishaan Sahib is an official copyrighted symbol of the Ravidassia religion. The Harr nishan is found atop the Ravidassias Bhawans or on the flag, every year the Harr Nishaan is changed on the auspicious day of Guru Ravidass Jayanti (happy birthday). The Ravidassias, especially of Punjab, hoist flags with the print of insignia "Har" atop their religious places, and on vehicles during processions on the occasion of Guru Ravidass' birth anniversaries and other festivities.

Harr Nishaan is the Ravidassia religious insignia. Strictly speaking "Nishaan" means "symbol" and is used in Ravidassia context to mean the mantras passed down by the saints. This insignia is also known as the "Koumi Nishan" (Religious Symbol) of the Ravidassia religion. Both of these words Harr or Saunh are directly or indirectly meant for meditation or in reciting of Ravidasia hymns. As a downtrodden people, the Dalit were neither allowed to be educated nor could afford to be so. The Guru Raidas spoke and communicated in local dialect. This enabled the Dalit to enjoy and progress in understanding and communicating their philosophy. The Ravidassia Guru's name is Ravi, meaning sun. Har means Supreme Being. The universe is illuminated due to the suns otherwise it would be in darkness. The second half of his name is Dass meaning "servant," therefore the Satguru of the Ravidassia sect is the "Servant of Illumination." By following his example, Ravidassia people are striving to become enlightened, as was their Guru. Harr Nishaan can also be found on the first page and on the fourth page of Amritbani Guru Ravidass Ji. The explanation of Harr Nishan is as follows:
 A larger circle with sunrays (40 rays of sunlight) - The forty rays round the circle of the insignia signify forty hymns of Guru Ravidass.
 In between the bigger and smaller circles is written a couplet (ਨਾਮ ਤੇਰੇ ਕਿ ਜੋਤੀ ਲਗਾਈ, ਭੇਈਓ ਭੇਈਓ ਭਵਣ ਸਗਲਈ) Naam tere kee jot lagayi, Bhaio Ujiaaro Bhawan saglaare (Your Name is the flame I light; it has illuminated the entire world)
 Star
 Flame - Flame represents the "Naam" (word) that would illuminate the entire world. sign of flame crosses over into the bigger circle.
 Circle - This circle depicts the whole universe, which is contained and run in God's order.
 Har (" हरि " " ਹਰਿ ") and Flame over it. „Har‟ represents the very being of Guru Ravidass and his teachings. The insignia Har is chosen after the name of their Guru [Ravi-Sun & dass-servant] (servant of the sun).

Harr Nishaan can also be found on the first page and on the fourth page of Amritbani Guru Ravidass Ji Ki.

Ravidassia emblem
The emblem of Ravidassia sect is Harr.

References

External links
 http://www.derasachkhandballan.com/

Ravidassia